Aril Brikha (born 1976 in Tehran, Iran) is one of the world's leading Assyrian techno musicians. He has been nominated for the Best Dance album in the Swedish National Radio Gold Gala contest in his adopted country of Sweden.

History
In 1998 Aril Brikha’s ‘Groove La Chord’ crossed generic boundaries. Is it techno? Is it house? Is it deep house? No one was more surprised by the success of the record than Brikha himself – he’d originally presented it on his demo as a potential B-side. It was not until two years after he recorded the track, when Derrick May played it in a club, that he realised it was good.

Brikha was born in Iran and emigrated to Sweden at a young age. In his early teens he developed an interest in electronic music – artists such as Depeche Mode, Front 242 and Jean Michel Jarre. Brikha obtained an Atari and started to use a sequencer and, after initially emulating the music of others, he began composing. Friends who heard his material told him it was 'Detroit techno'. Brikha had no idea what that was - and so they played him records by Robert Hood and Berlin's Basic Channel.

Brikha disseminated his earliest material on Swedish imprints - Dunkla, Plump, and Placktown - but realizing that his music was not what the local labels were seeking, he looked for fresh outlets – among them Derrick May's Transmat Records. Transmat contacted Brikha and, as a consequence, his Art Of Vengeance EP (with ‘Groove La Chord’) was issued on its sister label, Fragile, in 1998. A year on, Aril followed it up with the LP Deeparture In Time, a collection of evocative grooves gathered over a six-year period and laid down with just one keyboard, a drum machine and an Atari. It drew exultant reviews.

Since forging an alliance with Transmat, Brikha has toured solidly with his live show, playing everywhere from the inaugural DEMF (Detroit Electronic Music Festival) to clubs such as London's Fabric and Tokyo’s Air and Yellow.

Early career

Personal life

Discography

Albums
 2000: Departure in Time
 2007: Ex Machina
 2020: Dance of a Trillion Stars
 2020: Prisma

12"
 1998: Art of Vengeance MP
 1998: Art of Vengeance EP
 2000: Deeparture in Time
 2003: Simplicity
 2005: Prey for Peace
 2007: Winter EP
 2007: Akire
 2007: Room 337 / Kept Within
 2007: For Mother / Lady 707
 2010: Deeparture in Time - The Remixes
 2011: Forever Frost
 2011: Palma
 2012: Definition of D EP

References

External links
 https://web.archive.org/web/20110707180244/http://assyriatimes.com/engine/modules/news/article.php?storyid=3304
 http://www.discogs.com/artist/Aril+Brikha\
 http://www.myspace.com/arilbrikha
 http://www.allmusic.com/artist/aril-brikha-mn0000928399/overview/main#discography

Swedish male musicians
Assyrian musicians
Living people
1976 births
Musicians from Tehran
Iranian emigrants to Sweden
Iranian Assyrian people
Swedish people of Assyrian/Syriac descent
Peacefrog Records artists